The 2007 European Youth Summer Olympic Festival was held in Belgrade, Serbia, from 21 until 28 July 2007.

Sports

Venues
Venues used:

Participating nations

Medal table

See also
 2007 Australian Youth Olympic Festival

References

 
2007 in multi-sport events
2007 in Serbian sport
2007
Youth sport in Serbia
International sports competitions in Belgrade
Youth Summer Olympic Festival
Multi-sport events in Serbia
2007 European Youth Summer Olympic Festival
2007 in youth sport
July 2007 sports events in Europe